Matvey Slavin, also known as MatWay (russian: Матвей  Александрович  Славин) born on 19 April 1987 in Leningrad (modern day Saint Petersburg) is a German artist He lives and works in Copenhagen. He is a member of the artist duo Enfants Terribles and founder of Popdada.

Education 
He studied in 2006-2011 at Hamburg University of Applied Sciences, in 2011-2015 at University of Fine Arts of Hamburg among others by visiting prof. Markus Vater and in 2013-2014 at Akademie der bildenden Künste Wien by prof. Daniel Richter.

Work grants
In 2014-2015 he became work grants at Künstlerhaus Meinersen with a scholarship of the Foundation Bösenberg (1 year), in 2016 at Künstlerhaus im Schlossgarten in Cuxhaven (6 months) and in 2018 at Katholische Akademie Schwerte (3 months).

Exhibitions (selection)

Solo and duo exhibitions (selection)

 2008: Matvey Slavin: Die Elbe von der Speicherstadt bis Blankenese Kultur-Forum Altona, Hamburg, Germany
 2011: Matvey Slavin: Hamburger Landschaften Galerie Kunst-nah, Hamburg, Germany
 2012: Duo: Mensch und Ware – Altonaer Museum, Hamburg, Germany 
 2017: Matvey Slavin: Fiction Factory Galleri kunstmix, Copenhagen, Denmark
 2018: Matvey Slavin: Image Hunter Katholische Akademie Schwerte, Schwerte, Germany
 2018: Matvey Slavin: Image Hunter Galleri kunstmix, Copenhagen, Denmark 
 2019: Duo: Open Up Galerie subject-object, Berlin, Germany
 2020: Duo: Greifbar BLAA Galleri, Copenhagen, Denmark

Group exhibitions (selection)

 2008: wandsbektransformance. Die Gegenwart des Kolonialen Kunsthaus Hamburg, Germany 
 2008 Russische Variationen with Andrej Krementschouk a.o. Landdrostei, Pinneberg, Germany
 2009: Cartel21 Fabrik Gängeviertel, Hamburg, Germany
 2010: Zeitgenössischer Mythos Kunsthaus Speckstrasse, Hamburg, Germany 
 2011: Antlitz, Bildnis, Conterfey Frappant, Hamburg, Germany
 2012: Die Bionale - Zwischen Ackerbau und Hochkultur Galerie der HFBK, Hamburg, Germany 
 2012: Ideen von Landschaften Jenisch Haus – Museum für Kunst und Kulturgeschichte an der Elbe, Hamburg, Germany 
 2012: Zeitgeist Fabrik der Künste, Hamburg, Germany 
 2013: Sommerausstellung – Künstler der Galerie Kunsthaus Müllers, Rendsburg, Germany 
 2013: Norddeutsche Realisten in Hohwacht Kunsthaus Müllers, Rendsburg, Germany 
 2013: Norddeutsche Realisten – Bestandaufnahme Künstlerhaus Meinersen, Germany 
 2014: Zimmer Frei Museet på Koldinghus, Kolding, Denmark 
 2014: Xzibit - Die Ausstellung Projekthaus, Hamburg, Germany
 2014: Acchrochage with Hans Grundig, Lea Grundig, Bernhard Heisig, Janosch, Marcel Marceau a.o. Galerie Rose, Hamburg, Germany 
 2014: Chill Out Hengevoss-Dürkop, Hamburg, Germany 
 2015: Sommerausstellung with Udo Lindenberg a.o. Galerie Halbach, Celle, Germany 
 2016: Farben des Winters Museen im Kulturzentrum und Kunsthaus Müllers, Rendsburg, Germany 
 2017: Remix #1 Galleri kunstmix, Copenhagen, Denmark
 2017: Spurensuche Kunstverein Schwedt, Schwedt/Oder, Germany
 2017: Remix #2 with Markus Vater, Enfants Terribles a.o. Galleri kunstmix, Copenhagen, Denmark 
 2017: Sommer in Hamburg Galerie des Hotels Grand Elysée, Hamburg, Germany
 2018: Remix #3 with Enfants Terribles a.o. Galerie kunstmix, Copenhagen, Denmark
 2018: Remix #4 Galleri kunstmix, Copenhagen, Denmark
 2019: Friluftsmaleri i Glyngøre - Syv kunstnere fortolker Salling Museum Salling, Glyngøre, Denmark 
 2019: Remix #5 Enfants Terribles o.a. Galleri kunstmix, Copenhagen, Denmark
 2019: Remix #6 Enfants Terribles u. a. Galleri kunstmix, Copenhagen, Denmark
 2019: Kunst im August Galere subject-object, Berlin, Germany
 2020: By og land Galleri 2132, Roslev, Denmark
 2020: Ohne Einschränkung: Kunst Galerie subject-object, Berlin, Germany
 2020: Art of Giving SIRIN Copenhagen Gallery, Copenhagen
 2020: Lebenszeichen Katholische Akademie Schwerte, Germany
 2020: 20 x Testimony Kunsthal Vejle, Denmark
 2021: Efter-billeder I, JANUS - Vestjyllands Kunstmuseum, Denmark

Publications 
2012: Enfants Terribles Text: Till Bräuning. Publisher: Bräuning Contemporary, Hamburg, Germany .

2014: Enfants Terribles - Kinder der Louise B. Text: Friedrich Holtiegel, Joachim Voß. Publisher: Kunstverein Barsinghausen, Germany .

2015: Zeitbilder – Matvey Slavin. Text: Belinda Grace Gardner. Publisher: Irmgard Bösenberg, Meinersen, Germany .

2015: Matvey Slavin – Katalog Hamburger Landschaften. Text: Matvey Slavin. Publisher: Akademiker Verlag, Germany .

2015: Footwork Text: Kerstin Hengevoss-Dürkop, John Czaplicka, Matthias Schatz. Publisher: Galerie Hengevoss-Dürkop, Hamburg, Germany .

2017: Aus der Natur - Nana ET Matvey + Maike Gräf Text: Friedrich Holtiegel. Publisher: Kunstverein Barsinghausen, Germany .

2018: Matvey Slavin: Image Hunter. Foreword: Peter Klasvogt Text: Stefanie Lieb. Publisher: Katholische Akademie Schwerte, Germany .

2019: Copenhagen Open Air: Matvey Slavin. Text: Tom Jørgensen. Publisher: kunstmix. Copenhagen, Denmark .

2020: 101 kunstnere 2020/2021 Text: Nana Bastrup. pp. 180–181 Publisher: Frydenlund. Frederiksberg, Denmark .

References

External links
 Official website with comprehensive image database, biography, literature list and timeline

1987 births
Artists from Hamburg
Contemporary painters
Living people
German male painters
21st-century German painters
21st-century German male artists
University of Fine Arts of Hamburg alumni